Bela bella is a species of sea snail, a marine gastropod mollusk in the family Mangeliidae.

Description
The length of the shell attains 10 mm, its diameter 3.5 mm.

Distribution
This marine species occurs in the Agulhas Bank, South Africa

References

  Barnard K.H. (1958), Contribution to the knowledge of South African marine Mollusca. Part 1. Gastropoda; Prosobranchiata: Toxoglossa; Annals of The South African Museum v. 44 p. 73 - 163

External links
 Biolib.cz: Original image of a shell of Bela bella
  Tucker, J.K. 2004 Catalog of recent and fossil turrids (Mollusca: Gastropoda). Zootaxa 682:1-1295.

bella